Clitherall Lake is a lake in Otter Tail County, in the U.S. state of Minnesota. The lake is about one mile south of the village of Clitherall. Game fish in the lake include northern pike, largemouth bass, walleye, black crappie, and bluegill.

It is a clear lake with  water visibility.

Clitherall Lake was named for Major George B. Clitherall, a land agent and slaveowner.

See also
List of lakes in Minnesota

References

Lakes of Otter Tail County, Minnesota
Lakes of Minnesota